Andrea Raggi (born 24 June 1984) is an Italian retired professional footballer who played as a defender. He was a versatile player, being capable of playing both as a centre back and as a right back.

Club career
Raggi started his footballing career with Empoli, where he spent a total of four seasons with the first team.

Palermo
On 28 May 2008, Empoli announced his sale to Palermo for €7 million on a four-year contract.

His failure to break into the first team led Palermo to send Raggi out on loan to a number of teams. In January 2009 he joined Sampdoria, then moving again to spend the whole of the 2009–10 season with Bologna.

Bari loan
In July 2010, he was loaned out for a third consecutive time, joining Bari. He was out-favoured by Giampiero Ventura in mid-season, who originally expected Raggi to play as a centre-back. Instead, Raggi was the starting right-back as Andrea Masiello, originally a right-back, remained as a temporary centre-back which Masiello already played since January 2010. He also played as a left-back to replace Alessandro Parisi against Roma on 12 December. After the closure of the winter transfer window, Parisi and Masiello re-took the full-backs position, after the signing of centre-back Kamil Glik. Raggi blamed Ventura for playing so few games.

The following August, he permanently moved to Bologna, for €200,000.

Monaco
In July 2012, Raggi moved to Monaco, and later signed a three-year contract with the team. On 19 April 2017, after defeating Borussia Dortmund 6–3 on aggregate, AS Monaco reached the semi–finals of the 2016–17 UEFA Champions League. Later that year, Raggi won the 2016–17 Ligue 1 title with the club. In September 2017, he signed a two-year contract extension on a €2 million annual salary, which would keep him at the club until June 2019, with AS Monaco confirming Raggi's departure on 28 June 2019

International career
On 24 March 2007, Raggi made his International debut for the Italy U-21 side against the England U21 team in a 3–3 draw at the new Wembley Stadium.

Career statistics

Honours 
Empoli
Serie B: 2004–05

Monaco
Ligue 1: 2016–17
Ligue 2: 2012–13

Individual
Ligue 2 Team of the Season: 2012–13

References

External links
Profile at Football.it 

1984 births
Living people
People from La Spezia
Sportspeople from the Province of La Spezia
Italian footballers
Footballers from Liguria
Association football defenders
Italy under-21 international footballers
Empoli F.C. players
Palermo F.C. players
U.C. Sampdoria players
Bologna F.C. 1909 players
S.S.C. Bari players
AS Monaco FC players
Serie A players
Serie B players
Ligue 1 players
Ligue 2 players
Italian expatriate footballers
Italian expatriate sportspeople in Monaco
Expatriate footballers in Monaco